Nacoleia satsumalis is a moth in the family Crambidae. It was described by South in 1901. It is found in Japan and Korea.

References

Moths described in 1901
Nacoleia
Moths of Japan
Moths of Korea